London Buses route 97 is a Transport for London contracted bus route in London, England. Running between Chingford station and Stratford City bus station, it is operated by Stagecoach London.

History

On 31 January 1981 Route 97 was introduced to replace the northern leg of Route 69 between Leyton and Chingford, replacing Routemasters on that section. It was withdrawn temporarily between June 1987 and November 1988 when it was covered by the 69 again. 
The 97 was operated by London Forest until 1991, when that company was wound up. The route passed to Capital Citybus on 23 November 1991. Route 97 was included in the July 1998 sale of Capital Citybus to First London.

Upon being re-tendered, it was retained by First London with a new contract commencing on 26 February 2000. When next tendered, it passed to Stagecoach London's Leyton garage with a new contract commencing on 5 March 2005. Stagecoach London commenced a further contract on 6 March 2010.

On 10 September 2011, route 97 was extended from Leyton to Stratford City bus station to coincide with the opening of Westfield Stratford City. On 31 August 2013, the route was diverted to serve the new residential precinct around the Queen Elizabeth Olympic Park.
Sister Route 97A operated from 1981 and 2000 between Chingford and Walthamstow Central with various extensions to Leyton, Hackney and latterly Whipps Cross. It was replaced by Route 357.

Current route
Route 97 operates via these primary locations:
Chingford station  
Chingford Mount 
Walthamstow Market
Walthamstow Central station  
Baker's Arms
Leyton Midland Road station 
Leyton station 
Chobham Academy
Stratford International station  
Stratford City bus station  for Stratford station

References

External links

Timetable

Bus routes in London
Transport in the London Borough of Newham
Transport in the London Borough of Waltham Forest